Refugee Week takes place on the 20th of June each year. It is regularly used as a platform for holding hundreds of arts, cultural and educational events.

Refugee Week events are often intended to celebrate the contribution of refugees to the United Kingdom, and encourage a better understanding between communities.

Dates 

Refugee Week always takes place in the week closest to World Refugee Day (20 June).

The dates for 2009–2012 and for 2019 are as follows:

2009: 15 – 21 June
2010: 14 – 20 June
2011:  20 – 26 June
2012: 18 – 24 June
2019: Sunday 16 – Saturday 22 June

Events 

Events during Refugee Week are usually organised by different charities, local governments, homes, refugee community organisations, schools, faith groups, arts organisations, day centres and umbrella networks.

A multi-agency organisation called the Refugee Week partnership leads on unifying the events.

Events organised during Refugee Week are held independently from the Refugee Week partnerships and are not obliged to follow the suggested direction of the partnership.

Events include the annual Umbrella Parade and the Celebrating Sanctuary Festival in London. 2011 will also see a "100% British created by refugees" campaign to celebrate the contribution of refugees to British society, as well as a Simple Acts campaign which encourages people do a least one simple action in order to make a big change to the way refugees are perceived in the UK.

Partnership 

The strategic direction of Refugee Week is organised by the Refugee Week partnership, which is a multi-agency project, with representatives from the partner agencies forming the UK Steering and Operation Groups. The partner agencies of the Refugee Week partnership currently include: Amnesty International UK, British Red Cross, the Children's Society, Freedom from Torture, the Home Office, Oxfam, Refugee Action, Refugee Council, Save the Children Fund UK, Scottish Refugee Council, Student Action for Refugees, UNHCR, and Welsh Refugee Council

The Refugee Week partnerships' slogan is Different Pasts, Shared Future.

The Refugee Week partnership encourages event organisers to organise events around the idea that Refugee Week is a space of encounters between different communities and an opportunity to use more creative ways to bring refugee experiences closer to wider audiences.

Refugee Week Radio

The week also features an online broadcast by Refugee Week Radio with content produced by groups such as Refugee Radio and the British Red Cross

References 

Refugees